Petrona Hernández López (3 May 1890? - 14 February 2007), born Maria de la Cruz, better known as Amanda Aguilar, was a revolutionary from Nicaragua.

Biography 

Maria de la Cruz was reputedly born on 3 May 1890, she adopted the name Amanda Aguilar as a revolutionary and then later adopted the name Petrona Hernández López for her own protection. Her family lived in poverty in a rural area. 

López was a member of the Sandinista National Liberation Front (FSLN)  and fought for Nicaraguan independence against the Somocista dynasty from the 1930s until 1979. In 1961 her whole family joined the FSLN. She had three children, two of whom were killed by the dictatorship. Two of her brothers, Juan and Esteban Hernández, were also killed: they were thrown from an aeroplane. Her mother, María Venancia, was also part of the revolutionary struggle. In the 1920s they both collaborated with Sandino against the occupation by US Marines.

López died on 14 February 2007. After her death, president Daniel Ortega paid tribute to her heroism in the war. At her death she was considered the oldest woman in Nicaruagua. She was buried in El Carmen, Rancho Grande, at the church of the Assemblies of God.

The Women of the Cua 
During the 1960s many women from the municipality of El Cuá organised themselves so that they could support the guerrillas. In 1968, the area was attacked by the Somocista National Guard: the men were killed and the women were imprisoned. The National Guard wanted to obtain information about guerrilla activity, but the women refused to collaborate, as a result nineteen of these women were raped and tortured. These nineteen became known as the Women of the Cua. After six months of imprisonment, rape and torture they were released. Her mother, María Venancia, died during captivity. Upon release, López was spoke out about their experience, which shocked public opinion. López was the oldest member of the group, and became known as their leader. Other members included: Gladys Baez, Gloria Martinez, Doris Tijerino, amongst others. 

Their heroism was recorded in a poem by Ernesto Cardenal, which was published in 1985. It became a popular revolutionary song written by Carlos Mejía Godoy.

Awards 
The Order of Augusto Cesar Sandino - posthumously awarded, 2017.

Legacy 
In 2019 The Women Militants of the FSLN “Amanda Aguilar” were established as a campaign group for gender equality with the organisation, named after Lopez's revolutionary alias.

Aguilar on Film 
Las Mujeres del Cuá - a recording of the Women of the Cua, 2001

References 

Longevity claims
Nicaraguan women
Nicaraguan revolutionaries
Female revolutionaries
1890 births
2007 deaths